The Parker House is a historic house in Reading, Massachusetts.  It is a two-story wood-frame cottage, two bays wide, with a front-facing gable roof, clapboard siding, and a side entrance accessed from its wraparound porch.  It is a well-preserved example Queen Anne/Stick style, with high style features that are unusual for a relatively modest house size.  Its front gable end is embellished with Stick style woodwork resembling half-timbering, and the porch is supported by basket-handle brackets.

The house was listed on the National Register of Historic Places in 1984.

See also
Parker House (Salem Street, Reading, Massachusetts)
National Register of Historic Places listings in Reading, Massachusetts
National Register of Historic Places listings in Middlesex County, Massachusetts

References

Houses on the National Register of Historic Places in Reading, Massachusetts
Houses completed in 1881
Houses in Reading, Massachusetts
1881 establishments in Massachusetts